Cilix tatsienluica is a moth in the family Drepanidae first described by Oberthür in 1916. It is found in China (Sichuan, Hubei, Yunnan, Shansi, Shensi).

Adults can be distinguished from other species in the genus by the absence of a terminal fascia on the forewings, the poorly marked postmedial fascia (except at the apex) and the white fringe.

References

Moths described in 1916
Drepaninae